Pötschen Pass (el. 993 m.) is a high mountain pass in the Austrian Alps between the Bundesländer of Upper Austria and Styria.

See also
 List of highest paved roads in Europe
 List of mountain passes

Mountain passes of Styria
Mountain passes of Upper Austria
Mountain passes of the Alps